Raumer is a surname. Notable people with the surname include:

Friedrich Ludwig Georg von Raumer (1781–1873), German historian
Friedrich-von-Raumer-Bibliothek, a public library in Berlin
Hans von Raumer  (1870–1965), German politician of the German People's Party (DVP)
Karl Georg von Raumer (1783–1865), German geologist and educator
Rudolf von Raumer (1815–1876), German philologist and linguist